KSIT (99.7 FM) is an American radio station licensed to serve the community of Rock Springs, Wyoming.  KSIT's sister stations are KQSW 96.5, KRKK AM 1360, and KMRZ-FM.

History
KSIT signed on as the only classic rock station in Sweetwater County in 1978 at 104.5 FM. KSIT is also an affiliate of The Rockin' America Top 30 Countdown with Scott Shannon throughout the 1980s. The studios were located on Sunset Drive. In 1997, the station changed call letters to KMKX, playing a mix of formats from country to rock. It was owned by Sunset Broadcasting. The station returned to classic rock and the KSIT call letters in 1999. 
Prior to 1999, the station's competition included now sisters KQSW and KRKK. Big Thicket Broadcasting acquired KSIT shortly after.

Frequency change
In 2005, KSIT moved its frequency from 104.5 to its current 99.7 MHz to clear the path for the Utah radio station KYLZ to move to 104.7 MHz and change its city of license to Lyman, Wyoming. The frequency change was funded by the owners of KYLZ.  3 Point Media, the owners of KYLZ sought bankruptcy protection in July 2007, prior to the new KYLZ facilities being licensed for operation.

Format Change to Jack FM
On May 31, 2016 KSIT changed their format from classic rock (as "Rock 99.7") to adult hits, branded as "99.7 Jack FM".

Signal
KSIT covers almost all of Sweetwater County and also has fringe coverage in parts of northern Utah, northern Colorado and southeastern Idaho. The station's broadcast tower is located on top of Aspen Mountain, south of Rock Springs.

Previous logo

References

External links

SIT
Radio stations established in 1978
Sweetwater County, Wyoming
1978 establishments in Wyoming
Jack FM stations
Adult hits radio stations in the United States